Valley Park is a civil parish and a new town in the Test Valley district of Hampshire, England. The part of the parish is called Knightwood.

History
Valley Park sits near an Iron Age settlement.

The area underwent a large amount of development from the mid-1980s  to the 2000s. West of Knightwood Road was developed starting in 1994 and doubled the size of the town.

Amenities

Valley Park has local schools, a supermarket, a community centre and a leisure centre.

References

Populated places in Hampshire
Civil parishes in Hampshire
Test Valley